Haley Elizabeth Garwood (born 25 April 1940) is an American historical novelist. She has worked as an airline stewardess and as a teacher of special education students. She also teaches literature at university.

After her retirement as a high school principal in West Virginia, she began to write full-time. Garwood began her "Warrior Queen Series" with the book, The Forgotten Queen (1998). The series focuses on "forgotten women in history." She has four completed novels in her Warrior Queen Series about women warriors.  After Rani of Jhansi, she will be searching for an "African Queen" series.

Publications

Warrior Queen series
 The Forgotten Queen (1998)
 Swords Across the Thames (1999)
 Ashes of Britannia (2001)
 Zenobia (2005)
 Rani of Jhansi (2007)

References

External links
 Official site

1940 births
Living people
20th-century American novelists
21st-century American novelists
American historical novelists
American women novelists
Writers of historical fiction set in the Middle Ages
20th-century American women writers
21st-century American women writers
Women historical novelists
Educators from West Virginia
Novelists from West Virginia